Acontius is a young man in Greek mythology.

Acontius may also refer to:

 Abundius the Sacristan (died c. 564), also spelled Acontius, a sacristan of the Church of Saint Peter in Rome
 Jacopo Aconcio (c. 1520–c. 1566), also known as Jacobus Acontius, Italian jurist, theologian, philosopher and engineer
 Melchior Acontius (1515–1569), German poet
 Lucius Ranius Optatus, perhaps surnamed Acontius, an Ancient Roman official, a member of the Rania gens plebeian family
 Acontius (spider), a spider genus
 , a World War II motor torpedo boat tender

See also
 Acontias (disambiguation)